Joel Malcolm Davis (born December 29, 1993) is an American professional mixed martial artist and graduated folkstyle wrestler who currently competes in the welterweight division of Bellator MMA. As a wrestler at Notre Dame College, he was the only four-time undefeated NCAA Division II National Champion in history and one of the three to do so across all NCAA divisions.

Wrestling career

High school
Born in Compton, California, Davis attended Santa Fe High School, where he was a two-sport athlete, playing football and competing in wrestling. He started wrestling at age five, and he was a CIF state finalist his sophomore year and state champion in his junior and senior seasons as a high schooler. Nationally, he was a two-time FloNationals champion and a Reno champion.

Davis was an NCAA Division I recruit as a football player, however, he chose to wrestle.

College 
After graduating from high school, Davis committed to wrestle at the Notre Dame College.

Davis finished his true freshman season with 33 victories and no defeats and an NCAA title at 165 pounds. After moving up to 174 pounds, Davis compiled 35 more wins and closed the season undefeated, claiming titles from the Clarion Knight Point Open, Michigan State Open, Cleveland State Open, University of Indianapolis Greyhound Open, NCAA Division II Super Region I and the NCAA National Championship. As a junior, he compiled a record of 38–0 and won his third NCAA Division II National title. In his fourth and last season, Davis was able to close the show with a National title at 184 pounds and the Outstanding Wrestler Award, finishing his overall career with 133 wins and no losses.

Davis is one of the three undefeated four-time NCAA champions, sharing the podium with Cael Sanderson (159–0) from Division I and Marcus LeVesseur (155–0) from Division III.

Freestyle 
In May 2016, Davis competed at the annual Beat The Streets event, named Salsa in the Square. He faced three-time NCAA Division I Champion and Dan Hodge Trophy winner Alex Dieringer. He lost the match by points, being outscored 9 points to none.

Mixed martial arts career
Davis started competing in mixed martial arts while he was still competing in college, amassing an undefeated record of 5 wins and no losses.

Bellator MMA
Davis signed with Bellator MMA in June 2016, months after his last wrestling season in college.

Davis made his professional debut at an 175-pound catchweight bout against Keith Cutrone on August 26, 2016, at Bellator 160. He won the fight by unanimous decision.

Davis faced Justin Roswell on August 25, 2017, at Bellator 182 (a year later his previous bout). He won the fight by technical-knockout in the first round.

Davis faced Ian Butler on January 20, 2018, at Bellator 192. He won the fight by knockout 39 seconds into the first round.

Davis faced Craig Plaskett on June 29, 2018, at Bellator 201. He won the fight by unanimous decision.

Davis was scheduled to face Jesse Merritton on March 29, 2019, at Bellator 219. However, Merritton withdrew from the event and was replaced by Marcus Anthony. Davis won the fight by knockout in the first round.

Davis faced Jeff Peterson on October 9, 2019, at Bellator 229. He won the fight by knockout in a minute into the first round.

Davis faced Chris Cisneros on December 20, 2019, at Bellator 235. He won the fight by technical-knockout in the first round.

Davis faced promotional newcomer Bobby Lee on November 19, at Bellator 253. He won the fight by unanimous decision.

After a 2.5 year layoff, Davis is scheduled to make his return against Jeff Creighton on March 31, 2023 at Bellator 293.

Awards and accomplishments

Folkstyle wrestling 
 National Collegiate Athletic Association
NCAA Division II 165 lb National Champion out of Notre Dame College (2013)
NCAA Division II 174 lb National Champion out of Notre Dame College (2014)
NCAA Division II 174 lb National Champion out of Notre Dame College (2015)
NCAA Division II 184 lb National Champion out of Notre Dame College (2016)

Mixed martial arts record
 

|-
|Win
|align=center|8–0
|Bobby Lee
|Decision (unanimous)
|Bellator 253
|
|align=center|3
|align=center|5:00
|Uncasville, Connecticut, United States
|
|-
|Win
|align=center|7–0
|Chris Cisneros
|TKO (punches)
|Bellator 235
|
|align=center|1
|align=center|3:55
|Honolulu, Hawaii, United States
|
|-
|Win
|align=center|6–0
|Jeffrey Peterson
|KO (flying knee)
|Bellator 229
|
|align=center|1
|align=center|1:00
|Temecula, California, United States
|
|-
|Win
|align=center|5–0
|Marcus Anthony
|KO (punch)
|Bellator 219
|
|align=center|1
|align=center|4:21
|Temecula, California, United States
|
|-
|Win
|align=center|4–0
|Craig Plaskett
|Decision (unanimous)
|Bellator 201
|
|align=center|3
|align=center|5:00
|Temecula, California, United States
|
|-
| Win
| align=center| 3–0
| Ian Butler
| KO (spinning back kick)
| Bellator 192
| 
| align=center| 1
| align=center| 0:39
| Inglewood, California, United States
| 
|-
|Win
|align=center| 2–0
|Justin Roswell
|TKO (elbows)
|Bellator 182
|
|align=center| 1
|align=center| 1:35
|Verona, New York, United States
| 
|-
|Win
|align=center| 1–0
|Keith Cutrone
|Decision (unanimous)
|Bellator 160
|
|align=center|3
|align=center|5:00
|Anaheim, California, United States
|

NCAA record

! colspan="8"| NCAA Division II Championships Matches
|-
!  Res.
!  Record
!  Opponent
!  Score
!  Date
!  Event
|-
! style=background:white colspan=6 |2016 NCAA (DII) Championships  at 184 lbs
|-
|Win
|16–0
|align=left|Travis Mckillop
|style="font-size:88%"|3–1
|style="font-size:88%" rowspan=4|March 11–12, 2016
|style="font-size:88%" rowspan=4|2016 NCAA Division II Wrestling Championships
|-
|Win
|15–0
|align=left|Jacob Waste
|style="font-size:88%"|3–2
|-
|Win
|14–0
|align=left|Nick Burghardt
|style="font-size:88%"|8–2
|-
|Win
|13–0
|align=left|Brandon Supernaw
|style="font-size:88%"|MD 13–5
|-
! style=background:white colspan=6 |2015 NCAA (DII) Championships  at 174 lbs
|-
|Win
|12–0
|align=left|Zeb Wahle
|style="font-size:88%"|4–2
|style="font-size:88%" rowspan=4|March 13–14, 2015
|style="font-size:88%" rowspan=4|2015 NCAA Division II Wrestling Championships
|-
|Win
|11–0
|align=left|John Blankenship
|style="font-size:88%"|7–4
|-
|Win
|10–0
|align=left|Terrence Zaleski
|style="font-size:88%"|4–2
|-
|Win
|9–0
|align=left|Caleb Copeland
|style="font-size:88%"|MD 14–5
|-
! style=background:white colspan=6 |2014 NCAA (DII) Championships  at 174 lbs
|-
|Win
|8–0
|align=left|Adam Walters
|style="font-size:88%"|4–1
|style="font-size:88%" rowspan=4|March 14–15, 2014
|style="font-size:88%" rowspan=4|2014 NCAA Division II Wrestling Championships
|-
|Win
|7–0
|align=left|Patrick Martinez
|style="font-size:88%"|5–2
|-
|Win
|6–0
|align=left|Trevor Grant
|style="font-size:88%"|Fall
|-
|Win
|5–0
|align=left|Conner Monk
|style="font-size:88%"|Fall
|-
! style=background:white colspan=6 |2013 NCAA (DII) Championships  at 165 lbs
|-
|Win
|4–0
|align=left|Chase Nelson
|style="font-size:88%"|7–5
|style="font-size:88%" rowspan=4|March 8–9, 2013
|style="font-size:88%" rowspan=4|2013 NCAA Division II Wrestling Championships
|-
|Win
|3–0
|align=left|Isaiah Jimenez
|style="font-size:88%"|MD 11–2
|-
|Win
|2–0
|align=left|Justin Samora
|style="font-size:88%"|MD 18–4
|-
|Win
|1–0
|align=left|Wade Gobin
|style="font-size:88%"|11–7
|-

See also
 List of current Bellator fighters

References

Living people
American male sport wrestlers
American male mixed martial artists
Mixed martial artists utilizing collegiate wrestling
Mixed martial artists utilizing freestyle wrestling
1993 births